Eternal Eyes, known in Japan as , is a strategy video game developed by TamTam and published by Sunsoft and Crave Entertainment in 1999-2000.

Reception

The game received unfavorable reviews according to the review aggregation website GameRankings. In Japan, Famitsu gave it a score of 24 out of 40.

References

External links
 

1999 video games
Crave Entertainment games
Fantasy video games
PlayStation (console) games
PlayStation (console)-only games
Sunsoft games
Tactical role-playing video games
Video games developed in Japan